The second and final season of the Assassination Classroom anime television series is adapted from Yūsei Matsui's manga series of the same name. Produced by Lerche and directed by Seiji Kishi, the second season aired between January 7, 2016 and June 30, 2016 and was simulcast by Funimation, who began releasing the broadcast dub version from February 10, 2016. Adult Swim's Toonami programming block began broadcasting Funimation's English dub of the season on January 9, 2022.


Episode list

Home media release

Japanese
Avex Pictures has released the series on Blu-ray and DVD, in a limited edition, in Japan from March 27, 2015 to October 28, 2016.

English
Funimation has released the series on Blu-ray and DVD in North America, in a regular and a limited edition, since May 17, 2016.

Notes

References

2016 Japanese television seasons
Assassination Classroom